Rasmus Olai Steinsvik (22 September 1863 – 22 June 1913) was a Norwegian writer, magazine editor and newspaper editor. He was born in Volda, and was married to Marta Steinsvik. He edited the magazine Fedraheimen from 1889 to 1891, and started the newspaper Den 17de Mai in 1894, which he edited until his death. Among his literary works were Martyra from 1892,the story I dulsmaal from 1896, and Holmgang from 1909.

References

1863 births
1913 deaths
People from Volda
Nynorsk-language writers
Norwegian magazine editors
Norwegian newspaper editors